Maple Hall is a historic home located near Lexington in Rockbridge County, Virginia, USA. The house was built in 1855 and is a two-story, three bay, Greek Revival style brick dwelling on an English basement. It has a hipped roof and rear ell with a gable roof. It features a two-story pedimented front portico. The property includes the contributing two-story brick building which probably dates to the 1820s and a small log outbuilding. The home is currently occupied by a behavior modification program named Maple Hall Academy, and formerly housed a restaurant.

It was listed on the National Register of Historic Places in 1987.

References

Houses on the National Register of Historic Places in Virginia
Greek Revival houses in Virginia
Houses completed in 1855
Houses in Rockbridge County, Virginia
National Register of Historic Places in Rockbridge County, Virginia
1855 establishments in Virginia